The 2019 Judo Grand Prix Antalya was held in Antalya, Turkey, from 5 to 7 April 2019.

Medal summary

Men's events

Women's events

Source Results

Medal table

References

External links
 

2019 IJF World Tour
2019 Judo Grand Prix
Judo
Grand Prix 2019
Judo
Judo